This is a list of gliders/sailplanes of the world, (this reference lists all gliders with references, where available) 
Note: Any aircraft can glide for a short time, but gliders are designed to glide for longer.

Philippines miscellaneous constructors
 I.S.T. L-10 Balang  Institute of Science and Technology, Philippines - (Philippines Institute of Science and Technology)

Notes

Further reading

External links

Lists of glider aircraft